Don John may refer to:

People 
 John of Austria (1547–1578), Habsburg admiral
 John of Austria the Younger (1629–1679), Habsburg general

Other uses 
Don John (horse), a British Thoroughbred racehorse
 Don John, a character in Much Ado About Nothing
 Don John, an 1882 novel by Jean Ingelow

See also
 Don Jon, a 2013 film
 The Jester Don John of Austria, a 1633 portrait by Diego Velázquez
 Donjon (disambiguation)
 Donald John (disambiguation)
 Don Juan (disambiguation)